Pocket Full of Holes was an album independently released in Canada on December 1, 2008, in hopes of a big follow up to the Brandon Paris Band's breakthrough album On My Own. On November 3, 2008, Brandon Paris Band independently released their first single, "Say Goodbye" from the album to radio. "Say Goodbye", mixed by Mike Fraser (AC/DC; Hedley) and mastered by Adam Ayan.

Additional credits on Pocket Full of Holes include Jeff Dawson,  and Sheldon Zaharko, at Vancouver's Factory Studios.

Track listing
"Say Goodbye" – 3:41
"Drownin" – 4:04
"Can't Hate You" – 3:27
"Lust Break (interlude)" – 0:55
"Falling in Lust" – 3:39
"Twisted" – 2:52
"The Fool" – 4:16
"Pocket Full of Holes" – 4:42
"Superhated" – 3:29
"Voice Inside My Head" – 3:39
"Masquerade" – 3:31
"Never Get Enough" – 3:29
"Don't Fade" – 4:24

Singles

Personnel
Brandon Paris – Vocals
Dagriff–  Reggae Vocals
Chris Murray Driver – Drums
Marc Gladstone–  Keys and background vocals
Bryan Jasper–  Guitar
Brian Sanheim–  Bass and background vocals

References

Brandon Paris Band albums
2006 albums